Darb-e Hamzeh (also Romanized as Darb-e Ḩamzeh) is a village in Dehaj Rural District, Dehaj District, Shahr-e Babak County, Kerman Province, Iran. At the 2006 census, its population was 47, in 11 families.

References 

Populated places in Shahr-e Babak County